Harry Gustavus Shaffer, Sr. was the Republican President of the West Virginia Senate from Boone County and served from 1923 to 1925.

References

West Virginia state senators
Presidents of the West Virginia State Senate
1885 births
1971 deaths
People from Preston County, West Virginia
20th-century American politicians